Lukhi may refer to:
 Lukhi, Fariman
 Lukhi, Qalandarabad